James Glennon, ASC (August 29, 1942 – October 19, 2006) was an American cinematographer.

Career

Born in Los Angeles, California, Glennon was the son of cinematographer Bert Glennon. James started off working in the Warner Bros. mail room, and then moved to the camera department, including as director of photography of the American unit for Return of the Jedi. 

Beginning in 1970, Glennon worked as a cinematographer on feature motion pictures, Citizen Ruth, Election, About Schmidt and others including El Norte.

In 2005, his work on the HBO television series Deadwood earned him an Emmy Award. Glennon also worked as director of photography on a number of other television movies and program series, such as The West Wing, along with Carnivàle and Big Love for HBO.

Death

Glennon died unexpectedly on October 19, 2006 from complications (a blood clot) during surgery for prostate cancer. He was survived by his four children (by Charmaine Witus): Meghan (an actress), Allison, Andrew, and Juliet. He is buried at the Santa Barbara Cemetery.

Selected filmography

As cinematographer

References

External links 

2005 Emmy - Outstanding Cinematography For A Single-Camera Series
 American Society of Cinematographers ~ ASC official website
 James Glennon Photos

1942 births
2006 deaths
American cinematographers